Högvads BK is a Swedish football club located in Holsljunga.

Background
Högvads BK currently plays in Division 4 Västergötland Södra which is the sixth tier of Swedish football. They play their home matches at the Stråvi in Holsljunga.

The club is affiliated to Västergötlands Fotbollförbund.

Season to season

Footnotes

External links
 Högvads BK – Official website
 Högvads BK on Facebook

Football clubs in Västra Götaland County
2001 establishments in Sweden